"Sound of da Police" is a song by American rapper KRS-One. Recorded at D&D Studios in New York City with production handled by Showbiz, it was released in December 1993 as the second and final single from KRS-One's debut solo studio album Return of the Boom Bap.  It peaked at number 89 on the US Billboard Hot 100.

Content
The song criticizes police brutality and systemic racism. It begins with KRS-One whooping twice to evoke a police siren (the "sound of the police"); this recurs several times throughout the song. The heavy bass sample loop, and part of a guitar solo were taken from Grand Funk Railroad's cover of "Inside-Looking Out", the final track of their LP Grand Funk. Part of the drum track is taken from "Sing a Simple Song" by Sly and the Family Stone.

The music video was directed by Michael Lucero.

Charts

In popular culture
The song was featured in the American films Cop Out, Tag, Black and Blue, and the British film Attack the Block. It was featured as an in-game radio selection in the 2015 video game Battlefield Hardline (by Electronic Arts), and was used for the end credits of the 2016 movie Ride Along 2 and in the 2016 published The Angry Birds Movie soundtrack. It has appeared in the TV show Brooklyn Nine-Nine. The 'Whoop whoop, sound of da police''' hook has been referenced by ska punk band Sonic Boom Six on their track "Piggy in the Middle", by Body Count on their song "Black Hoodie" and in metal band Skindred on the title track of their 2002 debut album Babylon. The song plays over the final scenes and closing credits of season 3, episode 2 of Sex Education.

The song is well known in France, where the chorus is commonly misinterpreted as "assassins de la police". A remix of the song by DJ Cut Killer was featured in the soundtrack of the film La Haine. The hip hop duo Suprême NTM later sampled the chorus on their album Live''.

On February 3, 2012, hacker group Anonymous defaced the Boston Police Department's web page, replacing it with an embedded version of KRS-One's "Sound of da Police" music video and a message criticizing the department's treatment of the Occupy Boston movement.

References

External links
 

1993 songs
1993 singles
KRS-One songs
Political rap songs
Jive Records singles
Songs written by KRS-One
Songs about police officers
Songs about police brutality
Songs written by Eric Burdon
Articles containing video clips
Songs against racism and xenophobia
Music videos directed by Michael Lucero